Spragueia magnifica is a species of bird dropping moth in the family Noctuidae first described by Augustus Radcliffe Grote in 1883. It is found in North America.

The MONA or Hodges number for Spragueia magnifica is 9121.

References

Further reading

External links

Acontiinae
Articles created by Qbugbot
Moths described in 1883